5-Hydroxyisourate is an organic compound that is produced by the oxidation of uric acid.  The conversion is a major pathway in the antioxidant properties of urate.  The conversion is catalysed by urate oxidase.  

5-Hydroxyisourate rearranges to allantoin.

References

See also
 Urate oxidase
 Glycolaldehyde

Purines